Tauro may refer to:

 Tauro F.C., a professional football club in Panama City, Panama
 Tauro Sport Auto, a Spanish manufacturer of luxury sports cars
 Anahuac Tauro, a Mexican agricultural aircraft
 a brand of beer by Piedboeuf Brewery

People with the surname
 G. Joseph Tauro (1906—1994), Chief Justice of the Massachusetts Supreme Judicial Court; father of Joseph Louis Tauro
 Joseph L. Tauro (1931–2018), United States federal judge; son of G. Joseph Tauro
 Shacky Tauro (1959–2009), Zimbabwean football player and coach